Thomas Sewall Adams (December 29, 1873 – February 8, 1933) was an American economist,  and educator, Professor of Political Economy at Yale University and advisor to the U.S. Treasury Department.

Biography 
Born in Baltimore, Maryland, Adams graduated from Baltimore City College in 1893 and subsequently enrolled in Johns Hopkins University, where he received his BA in 1896 and his PhD in 1899. In 1899, Adams was appointed assistant to the Treasurer of Puerto Rico.  He served in that capacity for one year, before joining the faculty of University of Wisconsin–Madison as an associate professor of political economy in 1901. He was elevated to a  full professor in 1908.

Between 1911 and 1915, Adams served on the Wisconsin tax commissioner and drafted many of that state's tax laws. In 1916, he was appointed to the faculty of Yale University, where he served as a professor until his death in 1933.   An economic adviser to the U. S. Treasury (1917–1933), he is credited with much of the taxation policy of the World War I and post-war period. He was president of the National Tax Association (1922–1923), American Economic Association (1927), and member of the fiscal committee, League of Nations (1929–1933).

Publications 
Adams authored many books on economics and taxation policy, including
 1900. Taxation in Maryland. 
 1905. Labor Problems. with H. L. Sumner. 
 1907. Mortgage Taxation in Wisconsin and Neighboring States. 
 1908. Outlines in Economics. with Richard T. Ely
 1923. Manual of Charting. Prentice-Hall

References

External links 

 Thomas Sewall Adams papers (MS 31). Manuscripts and Archives, Yale University Library. 

1873 births
1933 deaths
Economists from Maryland
American political writers
American male non-fiction writers
Baltimore City College alumni
Writers from Baltimore
Johns Hopkins University alumni
University of Wisconsin–Madison faculty
Yale University faculty
Presidents of the American Economic Association